"So Anxious" is a song by R&B singer Ginuwine. It was written by Static Major, Benjamin Bush, and Timbaland for his second studio album 100% Ginuwine (1999), while production was helmed by the latter. The song describes the narrator anxiously waiting on his lover all night to return his calls so that she can meet him for romance. Released as the album's third single, "So Anxious" became Ginuwine's second top 20 pop hit. It also reached number two on the US Hot R&B/Hip-Hop Songs chart. The music video was directed by Chris Robinson..

Track listing

Credits and personnel
Credits lifted from the liner notes of 100% Ginuwine.

Benjamin "Digital Black" Bush – writer
Jimmy Douglass – mixing engineer
Stephen Garrett – writer
Ginuwine – vocals
Timbaland – mixing engineer, producer, writer

Charts

Weekly charts

Year-end charts

Cover versions
Drake sampled "So Anxious" in the songs "Legend" and "Madonna" on his 2015 mixtape If You're Reading This It's Too Late.
R&B singer August Alsina covered the song in March 2015, however it was not released as a single.
The Sunday Service Choir, a gospel group led by Kanye West, interpolates "So Anxious" in the song "Soul's Anchored" on their 2019 debut album Jesus Is Born.

References
	

1999 singles
Ginuwine songs
Song recordings produced by Timbaland
Songs written by Timbaland
Songs written by Static Major
1998 songs
550 Music singles
Epic Records singles